Eucalyptus tardecidens is a species of mallee or small tree that is endemic to north Queensland. It has rough, fibrous or flaky bark on the trunk and branches, lance-shaped adult leaves, flower buds in groups of seven, white flowers and shortened oval to cylindrical fruit.

Description
It has mottled grey flaky to fibrous bark on the trunk and branches. Flowering occurs from October to February and the flowers are white.

Taxonomy and naming
This ecualypt was first formally described in 1991 by Lawrie Johnson and Ken Hill in the journal Telopea from specimens collecte near Mount Carbine. They gave it the name Eucalyptus persistens subsp. tardecidens. In 2000, Anthony Bean raised the subspecies to species status as E. tardecidens in the journal Austrobaileya and the change has been accepted by the Australian Plant Census. The specific epithet is derived from Latin words meaning "tardily" and "falling", referring to the shedding of the outer operculum.

Distribution and habitat
Eucalyptus tardecidens is found on the Cape York Peninsula between Lakeland Downs and to the south of Mount Carbine where it grows in dry woodland.

Conservation status
This eucalypt is classified as "least concern" under the Queensland Government Nature Conservation Act 1992.

See also
List of Eucalyptus species

References

Trees of Australia
tardecidens
Myrtales of Australia
Flora of Queensland